Stewart Glacier is a glacier on the north side of Edward VII Peninsula, flowing northeast along the east side of Howard Heights into Sulzberger Ice Shelf mapped by United States Geological Survey (USGS) from surveys and U.S. Navy air photos, 1959–65. Named by Advisory Committee on Antarctic Names (US-ACAN) for Lieutenant Commander Wayne B. Stewart, U.S. Navy, co-pilot in LC-130F Hercules aircraft during Operation Deep Freeze 1968.

See also
 List of glaciers in the Antarctic
 Glaciology

References
 

Glaciers of King Edward VII Land